Molemen is an American hip hop record production team from Chicago, Illinois. It consists of Panik, Memo, and PNS. The group organized Chicago Rocks, an annual hip hop showcase.

History
In 1997, Molemen released an EP, Below the Ground. It was compiled with another EP, Buried Alive, on a 2000 compilation album, Below the Ground/Buried Alive. In 2001, the group released a studio album, Ritual of the Molemen. It includes guest appearances from Juice, Rhymefest, Vakill, C-Rayz Walz, Rasco, Slug, Aesop Rock, and MF Doom. In 2002, the group released a collaborative album with rapper Capital D, titled Writer's Block (The Movie).

Discography

Studio albums
 Ritual of the Molemen (2001)
 Writer's Block (The Movie) (2002)

Compilation albums
 The Soundtrack to the Underground Instrumentals (1999)
 Below the Ground/Buried Alive (2000)
 Chicago City Limits Vol. 1 (2001)
 Lost Sessions (2005)
 Chicago City Limits Vol. 2 (2006)
 Killing Fields (2006)

EPs
 Below the Ground (1997)
 Buried Alive (1998)
 Locked (2002)

Singles
 "Put Your Quarter Up" / "Persevere" / "Follow Me" (2001)
 "Currency Exchange" (2002)
 "Life Sentence" (2007)

References

External links
 Molemen Records
 

American hip hop groups
Record production teams